Quercymegapodiidae is an extinct group of stem Galliformes birds with fossils found in France and Brazil.

References 

 
Paleogene birds of Europe
Paleogene birds of South America
Paleogene France
Paleogene Brazil
Fossils of France
Fossils of Brazil

Prehistoric bird families